Cephalonia is a parliamentary constituency returning one MP to the Greek Parliament. It comprises the Cephalonia Prefecture.

Election results

Legislative Election

Members of Parliament

References

Cephalonia
Kefalonia